Camp Senia is a district of historic cabins near Red Lodge, Montana. Five of the approximately 25 cabins were burned on July 29, 2008 during the Cascade Fire, a large forest fire. The camp was originally a dude ranch.

References

Residential buildings on the National Register of Historic Places in Montana
Historic districts on the National Register of Historic Places in Montana
National Register of Historic Places in Carbon County, Montana